The Government House is a building in Chișinău of the Government of Moldova located on Great National Assembly Square and Stefan cel Mare Avenue. It was designed by Semyon Fridlin in 1964 on Victory Square (now PMAN) and along Lenin Avenue (now Stefan cel Mare Avenue). It used to be the headquarters of the Council of Ministers of the Moldovan SSR. The building is a 6-storey reinforced concrete structure, lined with white stone, made in the shape of a letter Russian letter П (translated to P in English). Above the main entrance to the building is the inscription "The Government of the Republic of Moldova", as well as the coat of arms of Moldova and the flag of Moldova. In 2010, the Monument to the Victims of the Soviet Occupation was opened right in front of the building.

Gallery

References 

Government buildings completed in 1964
Buildings and structures in Chișinău
Government of Moldova